Powder Valley (Pennsylvania German: Pulwerdaal) is a village in southern Upper Milford Township in Lehigh County, Pennsylvania. Powder Valley is part of the Lehigh Valley, which has a population of 861,899 and is the 68th most populous metropolitan area in the U.S. as of the 2020 census. 

It is located on the Indian Creek, which rises in the northwest, turns south, and flows through a gorge starting there into the Hosensack Creek, a tributary of Perkiomen Creek. The village uses the Zionsville Zip Code of 18092.

History
The area of modern day Powder Valley was once inhabited by the Lenape tribe and lived on for almost 10,000 years. The Lenape tribes were known to live along river fronts or creeks and to use the fertile land around these areas for farming purposes. Due to the long-term harvesting and planting of the land, its ability to sustain agriculture degraded and eventually could no longer sustain crop growth, leading to the land becoming uninhabitable and the tribes slowly left the area. In the 17th century, Dutch colonists arrived in the area and began buying animal pelts from the Lenape in exchange for European products. 

In 1682, William Penn and Quaker colonists arrived and founded the Pennsylvania Colony in the lower Delaware River. A peace treaty was signed with the newly arriving English and Lenape tribes; however, in subsequent decades, an estimated 20,000 colonists arrived in the area, forcing the Lenape to keep up with the colonists. The colony displaced many Lenape people and others were forced to assimilate.

When William Penn died in 1718, his two remaining sons, John and Thomas Penn, along with the leaders running the colony, stopped practicing many of William Penn's policies. They began considering selling land belonging to the Lenape in a agreement with the Penn family now known as the Walking Purchase. The Lenape were displaced from their land and as a result began raiding Pennsylvanian settlements. In 1788, most of the lasting Lenape were no longer living in the Pennsylvania region and began settling in the Ohio region.

After 1733, a large number of German colonists arrived into the lower Lehigh Valley area and began building homesteads in the immediate vicinity. It is thought that the Lenape in the area were either amiable or there were simply too little tribes in the area, however it was decided to build in the area in 1734. Originally Powder Valley was known as Piercetown, it was then changed to Powder Mill Valley, then shortened to its current name Powder Valley.

Public education
Powder Valley is served by the East Penn School District. Emmaus High School in Emmaus serves grades nine through 12. Eyer Middle School and Lower Macungie Middle School, both located in Macungie, serve grades six through eight.

References

Unincorporated communities in Lehigh County, Pennsylvania
Unincorporated communities in Pennsylvania